The 2011 Showtime Southern 500,  62nd running of the event, was a NASCAR Sprint Cup Series stock car race held on May 7, 2011 at Darlington Raceway in Darlington, South Carolina. Contested over 370 laps, 3 laps over the advertised distance, it was the tenth race of the 2011 NASCAR Sprint Cup Series season out of thirty-six. The pole position was won by Kasey Kahne of Red Bull Racing Team. The race was won by Regan Smith of Furniture Row Racing, the first win for both Smith and the team, with Carl Edwards in second and Brad Keselowski in third.

The race was the first ever start for T. J. Bell.

Report

Background 
Darlington Raceway is the second oldest speedway on the NASCAR schedule next to Martinsville Speedway. From above, the track has been long described as being shaped similar to an egg. Consequently, the track's banking is also affected by its shape. The frontstretch and backstretch are banked at 3° and 2°, respectively. Turns 1 and 2, which have a wider radius, are banked at 25° and turns 3 and 4, which are much tighter than the first two, carry 23° of banking.

Prior to the race, Carl Edwards held the Drivers' Championship lead with 326 points. Defending champion Jimmie Johnson was in second place, 9 points back, followed by Richmond Kyle Busch in third, 21 points behind Johnson. Four points behind Busch was Dale Earnhardt Jr. in fourth with Kevin Harvick one point behind in fifth. Kurt Busch, with 289 points, was in sixth followed by Clint Bowyer who was 5 points behind Busch. Ryan Newman, Matt Kenseth, and Tony Stewart rounded out the top 10 in points, all 3 separated by 3 points. Defending race winner Denny Hamlin was 17th in points. A. J. Allmendinger and Jeff Gordon remained in the wild card positions.

In the owner points battle, Tommy Baldwin Racing moved into the top-35 in owners' points for the first time on the heels of a 13th-place finish at Richmond, leading to a 3-way tie for 35th between the #32 team of FAS Lane Racing, the #13 team of Germain Racing, and the #71 team of TRG Motorsports.

*Withdrew.

Practice

Qualifying
Kasey Kahne would win the pole with a 27.131. Meanwhile, Scott Riggs would blow an engine coming into his second lap of his qualifying run. While he had set a time, it was not enough to get Riggs into the race, as Joe Nemechek would beat his time.

Did Not Qualify: #81-Scott Riggs, #71-Andy Lally, #92-Brian Keselowski
Withdrew: #75 Derrike Cope

Race
Regan Smith pulled off an upset and won the Showtime Southern 500 after holding off Carl Edwards on a late restart. There were 11 caution flags, the wildest one happening with 4 laps to go. During a 3 wide situation, Harvick got into Kyle Busch, who in turn got into Bowyer, who slammed the inside wall. He was not injured. Kyle Busch then turned around Harvick in Turn 1. After the race finished Harvick wanted to get Kyle Busch out of the car. After that didn't happen, Harvick went to Busch's car and threw a punch inside Busch's driver window, but Busch then drove off and Busch's car pushed Harvick's #29 car into the pit road wall instead. Tempers flared, and the incident further inflamed the tensions between the two men. After the race Busch and Harvick were both fined $25,000 and placed on probation for 4 races including the All Star Race.

Race results

References

Showtime Southern 500
Showtime Southern 500
NASCAR races at Darlington Raceway
May 2011 sports events in the United States